Guggulsterone is a phytosteroid found in the resin of the guggul plant, Commiphora mukul.  Guggulsterone can exist as either of two stereoisomers, E-guggulsterone and Z-guggulsterone. In humans, it acts as an antagonist of the farnesoid X receptor, which was once believed to result in decreased cholesterol synthesis in the liver. Several studies have been published that indicate no overall reduction in total cholesterol occurs using various dosages of guggulsterone, and levels of low-density lipoprotein ("bad cholesterol") increased in many people.  Nevertheless, guggulsterone is an ingredient in many nutritional supplements. Guggulsterone was also found to have interactions with the viral Adipose Ribose Phosphatase enzyme of SARS-CoV2 and can prove to be a potential candidate for the development of therapeutics for the treatment of COVID19.

Guggulsterone is a broad-spectrum ligand of steroid hormone receptors, and is known to possess the following activities:

 Mineralocorticoid receptor antagonist (Ki = 39 nM)
 Progesterone receptor partial agonist (Ki = 201 nM)
 Glucocorticoid receptor antagonist (Ki = 224 nM)
 Androgen receptor antagonist (Ki = 240 nM)
 Estrogen receptor agonist (Ki > 5 μM; EC50 > 5 μM)
 Farnesoid X receptor antagonist (IC50 = 5–50 μM)
 Pregnane X receptor agonist (EC50 = 2.4 μM ((Z)-isomer))

Guggulsterone has been found in animal research to be orally active; it has an absolute bioavailability of 42.9% after oral administration in rats, with a half-life of around 10 hours in this species, indicating a good pharmacokinetic profile.

References

Antiglucocorticoids
Antimineralocorticoids
Estrogens
Pregnane X receptor agonists
Pregnanes
Progestogens
Selective progesterone receptor modulators
Steroidal antiandrogens